The equestrian statue of Augustus is a bronze statue of Augustus, the first Roman emperor, riding a horse. It dates from 2007 and is in Mérida, Spain, located on a roundabout at the intersection of the Avenida de Portugal and the Avenida Reina Sofía.  Emerita Augusta, today Mérida, was founded as a Roman colony in 25 BC at the order of Augustus to serve as a retreat for the veteran soldiers (emeritus) of the legions V Alaudae and X Gemina.

History and description 
The sculpture was initially intended to be erected on the roundabout of Tres Fuentes, yet plans changed along the way. There is another sculpture of Augustus in a city's roundabout, near the Lusitania Bridge.

Cast in bronze in Madrid at Codina's foundry, the sculpture weighs 2.5 tonnes. The 3.75 metre high sculpture, features the Roman emperor riding a horse without stirrups, wearing a muscle cuirass, and brandishing a staff while keeping the sword in the belt. It lies on top of a granite plinth.

Shortly before the 2007 municipal elections, the sculpture was inaugurated in April 2007 along the whole reform of the traffic circle, with an inner radius of 7.50 m and an outer radius of 17.50 m, at about the same time that another equestrian statue also by Zancada featuring Augustus' son-in-law Marcus Vipsanius Agrippa.

References
Citations

Bibliography
 

Monuments and memorials in Extremadura
Buildings and structures in Mérida, Spain
Equestrian statues in Spain
Bronze sculptures in Spain
Outdoor sculptures in Spain
Sculptures of men in Spain
Cultural depictions of Augustus